

List of Ambassadors

Reda Mansour (Non-Resident, Panama City) 2018 - 
Mordehai Amihai-Bivas (Non-Resident) 2015 - 2018
Mordechai Palzur (Non-Resident, Santo Domingo) 1982 - 1986
Moshe Melamed (Non-Resident, Kingston) 1979 - 1981
Gideon Saguy (Non-Resident, Kingston) 1975 - 1979
Jacob Doron (Non-Resident, Caracas) 1967 - 1971

References 

Barbados
Israel